Christian Bove (8 May 1920 – 5 November 2007) was an Argentine rower. He competed in the men's eight event at the 1948 Summer Olympics.

References

1920 births
2007 deaths
Argentine male rowers
Olympic rowers of Argentina
Rowers at the 1948 Summer Olympics
Rowers from Buenos Aires